Zhuzhou, formerly Jianning (建宁), is a prefecture-level city of Hunan Province, China, straddling the Xiang River southeast of the provincial capital, Changsha, and bordering Jiangxi province to the east. It is part of the "Greater Changsha Metropolitan Region, also known as Changzhutan Golden Triangle" (comprising the cities of Changsha, Zhuzhou and Xiangtan).

, Zhuzhou had 3,855,609 inhabitants, of whom 1,055,373 lived in the built-up area (4 urban districts). With Xiangtan areas adjoining Zhuzhou due to be agglomerated in a few years' time, the joint built-up area will be home to 2,933,069 inhabitants.
Zhuzhou is located in a subtropical monsoon climate zone and with its abundant mineral and organic resources has one of the highest agricultural yields in Hunan province. Zhuzhou is home to a provincial public university of Hunan University of Technology.

Geography and climate
Zhuzhou has a humid subtropical climate with long, hot summers, and cool to cold, cloudy, damp winters with occasional snow flurries. Within its administrative area, the annual mean temperature is 17.7 °C (63.9 °F), with the coolest month being January, which averages 5.3 °C (41.5 °F), and the hottest July, at 29.5 °C (85.1 °F).

Administrative divisions
Zhuzhou city administers five districts, one county-level city and three counties.

Tianyuan District
Hetang District
Lusong District
Shifeng District
Lukou District
Liling City
You County
Chaling County
Yanling County

Government
The government of Zhuzhou has a structured in a dual party-government system like all other governing institutions in mainland China.

The Mayor of Zhuzhou is the highest-ranking official in the People's Government of Zhuzhou or Zhuzhou Municipal Government. However, in the city's dual party-government governing system, the Mayor has less power than the Communist Party of Zhuzhou Municipal Committee Secretary, colloquially termed the "CPC Party Chief of Zhuzhou" or "Communist Party Secretary of Zhuzhou".

Wu Zhankui served 16 years as the 3rd, 5th and 10th Mayor of Zhuzhou from 1953 to 1955, 1956 to 1968, and 1980 to 1983. He is the longest term Mayor of Zhuzhou.

Transportation

Zhuzhou is a very important transportation junction in South China. The Beijing–Guangzhou railway and the Shanghai–Kunming railway meet here, which makes Zhuzhou railway station, conveniently located in downtown Zhuzhou, one of the five special class passenger-and-goods transportation stations in China. On average, a train passes through every three minutes. Zhuzhou North Station is the largest goods transportation marshalling station in South China, with 110 trains and more than 30,000 passengers passing through every day.

The Beijing–Guangzhou high-speed railway serves the city as well. As almost everywhere along this line, the high-speed railway is routed away from the city core.

As well through its comprehensive railway system, Zhuzhou is connected to the rest of the country by 106 National Highway, 320 National Highway, 211 Provincial Highway, the Beijing–Zhuhai expressway, the Shanghai–Ruili expressway, and three highways linking south Fujian, south Jiangxi and south Hunan Province.

It takes about 30 minutes to drive to the airport by the Changsha–Zhuzhou Highway.

The Xiang River (Xiangjiang) flows through Zhuzhou, which makes it one of the eight river ports of Hunan Province.

Phase 1 of the world's first Autonomous Rail Rapid Transit (ART) system, opened in 2018 and was later extended.  The system uses 300 passenger rubber tyred vehicles capable of both following markings on the roadway and being steered by a driver.  It is commonly called either a "guided bus" and a "trackless tram".  The system was developed by the CRRC Zhuzhou Electric Locomotive Research Institute.

<noinclude>

Industry

Zhuzhou is the second largest city in Hunan Province; it is an industrial city with four key industries are metallurgy, machine manufacture, chemicals and building materials.

Zhuzhou became one of the eight key national-wide industrial cities in the 1st Five-Year-Plan. four out of 156 key projects were set up in Zhuzhou. Later on, more than 20 important factories were built in Zhuzhou.

Zhuzhou's high-tech industrial development zone was approved by the State Council in December 1992 and was designated in a  area next to the Xiang River.

Colleges and universities 
This is a list of institutions with full-time bachelor programs in Zhuzhou:

Hunan University of Technology

Building and structures
Zhuzhou Television Tower
Zhuzhou Stadium

International relations

Twin towns – sister cities
Zhuzhou is twinned with:
 Vanadzor, Armenia
 Sumgait, Azerbaijan
 Fredrikstad, Østfold, Norway and Zhuzhou signed a twin town agreement in 1999 after establishing contact in 1995. The two cities also signed agreements on student and competence exchange and culture. Also, two elementary schools—one in Zhuzhou and one in Fredrikstad—signed an agreement on friendship cooperation.  
 Durham, North Carolina, United States
 Southern Pines, North Carolina, United States; The O'Neal School in Southern Pines, North Carolina has partnered and developed an exchange program with Nanfang High School and Zhuzhou Foreign Language School.

See also
 Southern Hunan uprising (湘南起义), communist lead anti-Nationalist insurgency in today Zhuzhou
 Tomb of Yan emperor, Yan emperor was one of legendary Chinese rulers died and buried in Zhuzhou

References

 
Cities in Hunan